Sobieski (singular masculine; singular feminine: Sobieska; plural: Sobiescy) is a Polish noble family name, and may refer to:

People
 Sobieski family, or the House of Sobieski, a notable family of Polish nobility, whose members included:
 Marek Sobieski (1549/1550–1605), voivode of Lublin, father of Jakub Sobieski
 Jakub Sobieski (1590–1646), father of King John III Sobieski
 John III Sobieski (1629–1696), King of the Polish–Lithuanian Commonwealth from 1674 to 1696
 Aleksander Benedykt Sobieski (1677–1714), son of King John III Sobieski
 Jakub Ludwik Sobieski (James Louis Henry Sobieski (1667–1737), son of King John III Sobieski and last male line descendant of Marek Sobieski
 Teofila Zofia Sobieska (1607–1661)
 Katarzyna Sobieska (1634–1694)
 Konstanty Władysław Sobieski (1680-1726)
 Maria Teresa Sobieska (1673–1675)
 Teresa Kunegunda Sobieska (1676–1730), Polish princess
 Maria Klementyna Sobieska (1702–1735), wife of James Francis Edward Stuart, the Old Pretender
 Maria Teresa Sobieska (1673–1675)
 Maria Karolina Sobieska (1697–1740), duchess of Bouillon and last surviving member of the family.

Other people with the surname Sobieski:
 Ben Sobieski (born 1979), American football player
 Carol Sobieski (1939–1990), American screenwriter 
 Leelee Sobieski (born 1982), American actress
 Wacław Sobieski (1872–1935), Polish historian

See also Sobieski Stuarts (born 1795 & 1802), two brothers who claimed Stuart ancestry.

Places
Poland
 Sobieski, Masovian Voivodeship, in east-central Poland
 Sobieski, Podlaskie Voivodeship, in north-east Poland
United States
 Sobieski, Minnesota, city 
 Sobieski, Wisconsin, census-designated place
 Sobieski Corners, Wisconsin, an unincorporated community

Other uses
 Sobieski (train), a EuroCity express train between Vienna and Warsaw
 Sobieski Institute (Instytut Sobieskiego), a Polish think tank
 Sobieski Vodka, Polish vodka
 MS Sobieski, a Polish liner used as a troopship in World War II.
 Sobieski Stuarts

Polish-language surnames